Placentia is a city in northern Orange County, California. Its population was 51,233 during the 2020 census, up from 46,488 in the 2000 census. This includes the community of Atwood, which is included in the city of Placentia, and is located in its southeastern quadrant. Primarily referred to as a bedroom community, Placentia is known for its quiet neighborhoods.

In 1971, Placentia was honored with the prestigious "All America City" award, given out annually by the National Civic League to 10 cities in the United States.

History 

Indigenous peoples of California referred to by the Spanish as Gabrielenos, known as the Tongva, lived in the area for thousands of years. One estimate wrote that the native population in what was to become northern Orange County was at least 1000. The large village of Hutuknga was closely situated to the area that is now Placentia.

In 1837, the Mexican government granted the area that is now Placentia to Juan Pacifico Ontiveros as part of the Rancho San Juan Cajón de Santa Ana land grant.

In 1865, American pioneer Daniel Kraemer arrived and purchased . Many other American pioneers soon followed, and the community developed. 

The local school district was originally named the Cajon School District. In 1878, the school district's name was changed to Placentia School District by Sarah Jane McFadden, Placentia being derived from a Latin word meaning "pleasant place to live". She was the wife of William McFadden, who was the second White settler to arrive in Placentia. The town eventually took its own name after the school district.

The first commercial orange grove was established in 1880, worked by mostly Mexican and Anglo laborers.

20th century 

From a handful of scattered ranches, the core of the town was developed around 1910. It functioned as a major railroad stop along the Santa Fe Railroad for processing oranges. Later, during the Great Depression, a brief strike of citrus workers occurred in Placentia.

Oil was found in 1919, which led to the development of numerous oil wells in eastern and northern Placentia. The town of Richfield, which later became Atwood, was built to house oil workers. Mexican laborers formed the majority of the labor force in the oil industry. The neighboring town of La Jolla, Placentia was constructed for a similar reason as a segregated colonia.

Several schools were constructed in Placentia from the 1910s to the 1930s that were segregated between White and Mexican students. Isabel Martínez was the first student of Mexican parentage to graduate from Fullerton High School in 1931, being celebrated in the Placentia Courier as an "exceptional" Mexican. Within six years, the number of Placentia students graduating high school numbered only six. 

The predominately Mexican areas of Placentia were heavily hit by the Santa Ana River flood of 1938, which destroyed everything in the area but "the La Jolla School Building and three brick structures." The flood left 3,700 refugees and 1,500 homes uninhabitable, and "caused more than 50 deaths, most from the Atwood area." 

Mexican-American war veterans from World War II worked to end school segregation in Placentia in 1948. This campaign was led by Alfred Aguirre, who noted that some white ranchers believed Mexicans were good fruit pickers, but that "the White kids are too advanced" for Mexican students to keep up in the classroom.

The Mexican-American community in Placentia developed its own political power base in the 1950s. This resulted in the election of Aguirre to Placentia's city council from 1958 to 1962 and the registration of hundreds of Chicano voters in the city.

In July 2020, Placentia organized and established its own fire department, Placentia Fire and Life Safety Department, leaving the Orange County Fire Authority as the first city to ever disband from the OCFA.

Geography 
State Route 57 (the Orange Freeway) runs through the southwest section of Placentia. State Route 91 (the Riverside Freeway) passes directly south of the city. Districts in Placentia include the neighborhood of La Jolla and the formerly unincorporated community of Atwood.

Climate 
According to the Köppen climate classification, Placentia has a warm-summer Mediterranean climate, Csa on climate maps.

Demographics

2010 
The 2010 United States Census reported that Placentia had a population of 50,533. The racial make-up of Placentia was:

 31,373 (62.1%) White (44.7% Non-Hispanic White) 
 914 (1.8%) African American
 386 (0.8%) Native American
 7,531 (14.9%) Asian
 74 (0.1%) Pacific Islander
 8,247 (16.3%) from other races
 2,008 (4.0%) from two or more races 
 18,416 persons (36.4%) were Hispanics or Latinos of any race.

The census reported that 50,196 people (99.3% of the population) lived in households, 253 (0.5%) lived in noninstitutionalized group quarters, and 84 (0.2%) were institutionalized.

Of the 16,365 households, 38.6%had children under 18 living in them, 57.4% were opposite-sex married couples living together, 12.6% had a female householder with no husband present, 5.5% had a male householder with no wife present, 4.6%  were unmarried opposite-sex partnerships, and 0.6% were same-sex married couples or partnerships. About 17.6% of households were made up of individuals, and 7.8% had someone living alone who was 65 or older. The average household size was 3.07. There were 12,366 families (75.6% of all households); the average family size was 3.44.

In the city, the age distribution was 24.6% under 18, 10.3% from 18 to 24, 27.6% from 25 to 44, 24.9% from 45 to 64, and 12.6% were 65 or older. The median age was 36.0 years. For every 100 females, there were 97.0 males. For every 100 females  18 and over, there were 93.7 males.

The homeowner vacancy rate was 0.8%; the rental vacancy rate was 4.7%. About 62.9% of the population lived in owner-occupied housing units and 36.5% lived in rental housing units.

The median household income was $75,693, with 12.2% of the population living below the federal poverty line.

2000 
At the 2000 census, there were 46,488 people, 15,037 households and 11,683 families residing in the city. The racial make-up was 67.76% White, 1.77% African American, 0.83% Native American, 11.16% Asian, 0.18% Pacific Islander, and 13.58% from two or more races. Hispanics or Latinos of any race were 31.10% of the population.

Of the 15,037 households, 37.9% had children under 18 living with them, 61.5% were married couples living together, 50.2% had a female householder with no husband present, and 22.3% were not families. About 16.0% of all households were made up of individuals, and 4.9% had someone living alone who was 65 or older. The average household size was 3.07, and the average family size was 3.42.

The age distribution was 27.0% under 18, 9.5% from 18 to 24, 32.0% from 25 to 44, 22.4% from 45 to 64, and 9.1% were 65 or older. The median age was 33 years. For every 100 females, there were 98.2 males. For every 100 females  18 and over, there were 96.0 males.

The median household income was $62,803 and the median family income was $68,976. These figures had risen to $77,496 and $83,674, respectively, in a 2007 estimate. Males had a median income of $46,956 and females $34,184. The per capita income was $23,843. About 5.7% of families and 8.7% of the population were below the poverty line, including 12.2% of those under age 18 and 5.7% of those 65 or over.

Economy 
Placentia has a $20 million Metrolink project that started in the downtown area in 2013. This project is in conjunction with the Orange County Transit Authority (OCTA), and will assist in the continued revitalization of the area, which is also scheduled for the building of more transit-oriented housing to complement the train station, mixed use, retail, and entertainment. All are designed to enhance Placentia's unique presence in Orange County. Placentia is also working with the OCTA on the OC Bridges project. The project, combined with the city of Fullerton, provides around $580 million in funding to build underpasses and/or overpasses at the major north-south roadways in the two cities. The roadways are Lakeview Avenue, Rose Drive/Tustin Avenue, Orangethorpe Avenue, Kraemer Boulevard, Placentia Avenue, State College Boulevard, and Raymond Avenue. The underpasses and overpasses at Placentia, Kraemer, Rose/Tustin and Lakeview are complete.

Top employers 
According to Placentia's 2012 Comprehensive Annual Financial Report:, the top employers in the city are:

Arts and culture 
The George Key Ranch Historic District is a historic citrus ranch and Victorian ranch house in Placentia. It is now within the  George Key Ranch Historic Park, with the historic house museum, outdoor displays, and a citrus grove. It is on the National Register of Historic Places. The Placentia-Santa Fe District is in the southwest or downtown area. The town is home to the A. S. Bradford House, a historic house museum. It is also home to the 100-year-old Berkenstock Mansion.

In 1973, Chicano Park's "founding lead artist" Guillermo Aranda and "founding apprentice artist" Ernesto "Neto" Paul (San Diego natives) collaborated with the art students of the University of California, Irvine (UCI) in painting a mural (about 8 x 36 ft) on the walls of the Tlatepaque Restaurant. Aranda was invited by a professor at UCI. The following year, the chairman of Toltecas en Aztlan, and the board director of the Centro Cultural De La Raza, Guillermo Aranda, also invited these same Orange County artists referred to as the "Santa Ana muralists/Santa Ana artists", to come to Chicano Park and paint on one of the first pillars (second painted pillar) of Chicano Park.

Government and politics

Local 
Placentia is a charter city with  elected city council members, city clerk, and city treasurer, and professional city manager.

Elected officials
Mayor Rhonda Shader
Mayor pro tem Ward Smith
 Council Member Craig Green
 Council Member Chad P. Wanke
 Council Member Jeremy B. Yamaguchi
 City Clerk Patrick J. Melia
 City Treasurer Kevin A. Larson

Appointed officials
 City Administrator Damien R. Arrula
 City Attorney Christian L. Bettenhausen

Mayors since 1989

Unless otherwise noted, mayoral terms begin and end in December.

The voters of Placentia also elect the boards of the Placentia Library District and the Placentia-Yorba Linda Unified School District.

State and federal representation 

According to the California Secretary of State, as of February 10, 2019, Placentia has 27,328 registered voters. Of those, 10,285 (37.64%) are registered Republicans, 8,510 (31.14%) are registered Democrats, and 7,400 (27.08%) have no political party preference or are independent.

Education

Placentia Library District 
Placentia is home to one of the 13 special district libraries in California. The Placentia Library District is a single-purpose library district governed by an elected board of trustees. Its principal source of income is property tax proration. The library's early history is much like other communities. Beginning in 1914, the Women's Christian Temperance Union established a reading and recreation room for boys in a storefront on Bradford Avenue. After a successful petition and election by the residents, the Placentia Library District was officially formed on September 2, 1919. The new library district included seven square miles of the Placentia area: the north line was beyond Golden Avenue, the east line along Linda Vista through Hazard's subdivision,the south through Golden State Tract but not as far as Miraloma Avenue and the west line along the Fullerton boundary. The library board of trustees hired Placentia's first librarian, Sara Rideout, for $0.25 an hour, and the Women's Christian Temperance Union turned over their reading room and 193 books. The library officially opened to the public on January 15, 1920, from 2:00–5:00 pm and 7:00–9:00 pm. By 1926, a new library building was needed to meet the needs of the growing community. The building, designed in the Spanish Colonial Revival style by renowned architect Carleton Monroe Winslow, features beautiful Talavera tiles created by Mexican potter Pedro Sanchez. In March 1927, the grand opening was held for the new library building located at 143 S. Bradford Avenue. In 1974, the library again become too small for its growing collection and was moved to its current location in the Civic Center Plaza. That same year, the library boundaries expanded to reflect the same boundaries as the city.

Today, the Placentia Library District has over 330,000 visitors annually, with over 42,000 library cards issued. The library holds over 102,000 materials. In September 2018, the Placentia Library began a major $2.3 million renovation/modernization project as part of the library’s centennial anniversary. The project was completed on September 14, 2019.

Public schools 
Placentia is a part of the Placentia-Yorba Linda Unified School District (PYLUSD). The three high schools in the city are:
 El Dorado High School.
 Valencia High School. The oldest high school in Placentia, it opened in 1933. VHS offers an international baccalaureate program and a technology track known as ValTech.
El Camino Real High School was named a "Model Continuation High School" by the California State Department of Education.

In addition, Placentia supports: Kraemer Middle School, Valadez Middle School Academy, and Tuffree Middle School. The city houses numerous public elementary schools: Brookhaven Elementary, George Key Elementary, Golden Elementary, Morse Elementary, Melrose Elementary, Ruby Drive Elementary, Sierra Vista Elementary, Tynes Elementary, Van Buren Elementary, and Wagner Elementary.

Independent schools 
The Parkview School provides an independent study kindergarten-grade 12 school for students who are "homeschoolers, student actors, junior athletes, chronically ill, or in various other situations for which an alternative to classroom-based instruction is desirable."

Transportation 
The Metrolink 91/Perris Valley Line passes through the southern portion of the city. The city has been preparing the area of a proposed new station located at Melrose Avenue and Crowther Avenue in Old Town Placentia. Placentia Station is estimated to cost $35 million; the city will contribute $5.4 million. A tentative completion date was set for June 2022, but construction is now "on hold" pending further negotiations with BNSF.

In 2007, the city became the first city to implement a quiet zone for the cargo-carrying trains that pass through the city daily, using locomotive grade-crossing predictors and intercrossing ground-based radio communications to effect a corridor where crossing gate arms become actuated prior to the train's approach, enabling trains to not be required to announce their approach by sounding the Morse code letter "Q" on their whistles, which is otherwise mandated by the Federal Railroad Administration. The city's Quiet-Zone-Update web pages offer information on the zone's scope and any temporary or long-term alterations to the quiet zone.

The city is served by the Orange County Transportation Authority, with: 
 Route 153 running along Placentia Avenue
 Route 129 running also Kraemer Blvd
 Route 71 running along Rose Drive 
 Route 26 running along Yorba Linda Blvd
 Route 123 running along Chapman Avenue
 Route 30 running along Orangethorpe Avenue

The 2002 Placentia train collision occurred on April 23, 2002, when a BNSF Railway freight train collided head-on with a Metrolink train in Placentia, near the Atwood Junction, at the intersection of Orangethorpe Avenue and Van Buren Street. Two people died in the crash and 22 were seriously injured.

Notable people 

 Agent Orange, a punk rock band, formed in Orange County in 1979.
 Kevin Blankenship, is a professional baseball player from Placentia and an El Dorado High School class of 1981 graduate.
 Michael Chang, professional tennis player, French Open champion, member of Hall of Fame
 Peter Daut, a news presenter at KESQ-TV, grew up in Placentia and graduated from El Dorado High School.
 Chris Draft, NFL professional football player
 Janet Evans, Olympic swimmer, four-time gold medalist
 Jackie Francois, musician
 Josh Freese, musician
 Michele Granger, softball pitcher, was born in Placentia.
 Courtney Hicks, figure skater, was born in Placentia.
 Kottonmouth Kings, hip hop group
 Kingspade, hip hop group
 Phil Nevin, baseball player
 Kherington Payne, So You Think You Can Dance contestant, Pussycat Doll
 Shawn Ray, bodybuilder
 Johnny Richter, rapper
 Equanimeous St. Brown, NFL professional football player
 Corrie ten Boom, a Holocaust survivor and rescuer in the Dutch underground during World War II, and author, emigrated to Placentia in 1977 and died there in 1983.
 Brett Tomko, a Major League Baseball player, attended El Dorado High School.
 Bret Boone, a Major League Baseball player, attended El Dorado High School.

References

External links 

 
 City-Data.com Comprehensive Statistical Data and more about Placentia

 
Cities in Orange County, California
Populated places on the Santa Ana River
Populated places established in 1926
1926 establishments in California
Incorporated cities and towns in California